Paul Christian Scheer (born January 31, 1976) is an American actor, comedian, writer, producer, director, and podcaster.

Scheer is a SAG award-winning actor known for his roles in Showtime's comedy series Black Monday and FX/FXX's The League. Scheer co-created and starred in MTV's Human Giant and Adult Swim's series NTSF:SD:SUV::. He has had recurring roles on ABC's Fresh Off the Boat  and HBO's Veep. He co-hosts the award-winning film discussion podcast How Did This Get Made? alongside his wife, June Diane Raphael, and Unspooled, with film critic Amy Nicholson.

Early life and education
Scheer was born in Huntington, New York, to Gail Ann (Decarlo) and William Paul Scheer. Scheer attended Catholic schools during his childhood and graduated from St. Anthony's High School. Scheer began performing in high school with Chicago City Limits, a New York-based short-form improv group. He later attended New York University, where he majored in communication and education. Scheer often speaks about his early life on the How Did This Get Made? podcast.

Career

Live performances 
In 1995, Scheer became a member of New York City's longest-running Off-Broadway comedy show, Chicago City Limits. As a member of their touring company, Scheer extensively traveled throughout the United States and overseas.

In 1998, while at NYU, Scheer started performing at the Upright Citizen's Brigade Theater in New York City. Scheer performed in multiple weekly shows, including Talk Show,The Real Real World and the house team Respecto Montalban. The group included Rob Riggle, Rob Huebel, Jack McBrayer, and Dannah Feinglass. They performed long-form improvisation to sold-out crowds every Saturday night for over five years and starred in a political sketch comedy show called George Bush is a Motherfucker.

In 2002, Scheer created and starred in Automatic Vaudeville at the Ars Nova theater, which The Hollywood Reporter called "one of the top five shows in the country".

In 2006, Scheer moved to Los Angeles and was a regular performer at Upright Citizens Brigade Theatre in Los Angeles (UCBTLA) until it closed its doors in 2020 due to pandemic-related issues. He performed an improvised show based on audience members' Facebook profiles called FACEBOOK. The show was named the "Best Improv Show" by Los Angeles magazine and has been profiled on Good Morning America. Cast members include McBrayer, Riggle, and Huebel.

Television
In 2003, Scheer was hired as a writer and performer for Oxygen’s Meow TV. Meow TV was a project by Meow Mix that aired programming for cats and their owners.

Best Week Ever 
From 2004 to the conclusion of the show’s first run in 2009, Scheer was a regular cast member on VH1’s Best Week Ever. The show, which originally featured a panel of comedians including Scheer, shifted to a single host format under Paul F. Tompkins and provided comedic commentary on popular culture. Other panelists included Nick Kroll, John Mulaney and Patton Oswalt.

Human Giant 

In 2005, Scheer began collaborating with comedians Rob Huebel, Aziz Ansari, and Jason Woliner on short films. Their first videos were Shutterbugs and Illusionators. Shutterbugs saw Huebel and Ansari play talent agents for child actors, and llusionators, starred Ansari and Scheer as Criss Angel-style magicians. In mid-2006, MTV greenlit a sketch series from the trio, called Human Giant. The series debuted April 5, 2007, and ran for two seasons from 2007 to 2008, exploring comedic aspects of modern life and pop culture.

The League 
In 2009, Scheer joined the semi-scripted FX comedy, The League, from Jeff and Jackie Marcus Schaffer about a group of friends in a fantasy football league. Scheer plays Dr. Andre Nowzick, a rich plastic surgeon whose naivete makes him the butt of many jokes. Scheer co-scripted a handful of episodes: "The Anniversary Party," "Expert Witness," "The Out of Towner," and "Tailgate" with co-star Nick Kroll; he co-wrote the episode "Bringer Show" with Stephen Rannazzisi and was the sole credited writer of episode 81, "The Block." The series premiered on October 29, 2009, and ran for seven seasons through December 2015.

NTSF:SD:SUV:: (National Terrorism Strike Force: San Diego: Sport Utility Vehicle) 
In 2009, Scheer created a 15-minute spoof commercial for an action series called NTSF:SD:SUV:: (National Terrorism Strike Force: San Diego: Sport Utility Vehicle), that aired on Adult Swim. Shortly after airing, it was picked up as a series and ran for three seasons (40+ episodes). Scheer played Trent Hauser. The cast included Kate Mulgrew, Rebecca Romijn, Martin Starr, June Diane Raphael, Rob Riggle, Brandon Johnson, and the voice of Peter Serafinowicz as S.A.M. Scheer served as executive producer, writer, director, and actor. It was produced by Abominable Pictures, Inc. and Scheer's 2nd Man on the Moon Productions. The show concluded with a special “movie event” shot in London, which was made to look like San Diego.

Fresh Off the Boat 
In 2015, Paul Scheer joined the cast of Fresh Off the Boat, an ABC comedy loosely based on a memoir by chef Eddie Huang. Scheer played the recurring role of Mitch, whom Eddie Huang hired to be the host at a steakhouse restaurant. He appeared in 26 episodes over the show's six seasons.

Veep 
In 2017, Scheer joined the sixth season of Veep as the character Stevie, the producer of CBS Morning News Show. He won a SAG Award for an Outstanding Performance by a Cast or Ensemble in a Comedy Series. In 2020, Scheer returned to the cast of Veep along with other special guests, including Don Cheadle, Mark Hamill, Beanie Feldstein, Stephen Colbert, and Bryan Cranston in a live table read playing multiple roles to support turnout for the Georgia runoff elections.

Black Monday 
In 2018, Scheer joined the Showtime pilot for Black Monday. The show is an ensemble period comedy about the Wall Street crash in 1987 and premiered on Showtime on January 20, 2019. Scheer plays Keith, a closeted stockbroker who was originally scripted to die in the first season. That plotline was later altered. Black Monday aired for three seasons, concluding in 2021. Scheer's performance was named in the Hollywood Reporter's “Top 30 best Supporting characters on TV” in 2019.

Other work 
Scheer has appeared in recurring roles on 30 Rock, The Good Place, Future Man, I'm Sorry, and the Nick Jr. series Yo Gabba Gabba!. Scheer also had recurring animated series appearances on Star Trek: Lower Decks, Big City Greens, Big Mouth, and Adventure Time. Scheer and Jack McBrayer made semi-regular appearances on Yo Gabba Gabba!, during a segment called "Knock Knock Joke of the Day". They were featured as themselves in the Yo Gabba Gabba! comic book, and made appearances on the Yo Gabba Gabba! live tour. In 2012, Scheer appeared as a villainous Cowboy Android in an episode of The Aquabats! Super Show!, another series from the creators of Yo Gabba Gabba!

Scheer appeared as a contestant on the second season of Nailed it! Holiday. He won the competition, but chose not to keep the $10,000 prize, and instead split it between the other two contestants. In August 2015, Scheer and Rob Huebel created a comedy special on a moving bus, Crash Test, produced by Paramount and released on Comedy Central. In 2017, he appeared on Celebrity Family Feud and lost to his wife, June.

Producing 
In addition to acting, Scheer has produced The Hotwives for Hulu, Party Over Here for Fox, Drive Share for Go90, Filthy Preppy Teen$ for FullScreen, The Amazing Gayle Pyle for Amazon, and Unsend for Comedy Central. In 2016, in addition to executive producing Party Over Here, Scheer created and directed segments for the late-night sketch comedy series with The Lonely Island. It starred Nicole Byer, Alison Rich, and Jessica McKenna.

Scheer and Jonathan Stern are executive producers on the Hulu comedy series The Hotwives. Scheer also co-stars in the series.

Internet and streaming projects 
Scheer and Rob Huebel are co-creators and directors on the Go90 comedy series Drive Share. Scheer also co-created Filthy Preppy Teen$ with Curtis James Gwinn and Jon Stern.

In 2013, upon the return of The Arsenio Hall Show, Scheer launched a web series for JASH called The ArScheerio Paul Show. In each episode, Scheer re-creates interviews from Arsenio Hall's original show, including the famous Bill Clinton episode, with Will Arnett playing Clinton. Scheer sports a comically enlarged flat-top haircut to resemble Hall.

In 2014, Scheer co-wrote and co-starred in multiple episodes of the Adult Swim mockumentary, The Greatest Event in Television History, detailing the recreation of famous television show openings. In 2015, Scheer launched a follow-up web series with JASH to Arscheerio Paul called, ScheeRL, which recreates interviews from MTV's Total Request Live hosted by Carson Daly, with Scheer playing the role of Daly and various comedians playing the musician guests.

In 2016 Scheer lent his voice to the first Vine animated series White Ninja as the titular character. In 2017 Scheer produced and starred in Playdates, the first independent pilot to debut at Sundance Group, alongside Carla Gallo.

In 2020 Scheer started the FriendZone Channel on Twitch, where he and other comedians put on weekly shows. Their streams have raised money for charities like Miles for Migrants & Feeding America. In 2021, Scheer's YouTube web series, Marvel Presents The World's Greatest Book Club, won an honorary Webby for best reality program.

Podcasting
How Did This Get Made? a podcast hosted by Scheer, his wife June Diane Raphael, and Jason Mantzoukas launched in 2010 on Earwolf. Each episode has a celebrity guest/comedian and features the deconstruction and mockery of terrible films. In 2011, iTunes selected How Did This Get Made? as its favorite comedy podcast of the year. In 2012, LA Weekly named the show "The Best Comedy Podcast." Guests have included Kevin Smith, Damon Lindelof, "Weird" Al Yankovic, Danny Trejo, Vanilla Ice, Adam Scott, Tatiana Maslany, and Nick Kroll. In 2022, How Did This Get Made? won the iHeartRadio Podcast Award for best TV & film podcast. The podcast also won the 2022 Ambie Award for Best Comedy podcast.

In 2018, Scheer started Unspooled, a podcast dedicated to watching and discussing all 100 films on the American Film Institute's top movies of all time, with co-host Amy Nicholson. Unspooled was well received by the press earning top reviews from Esquire, Vanity Fair, Town & Country Magazine, Vulture and Rolling Stone. In 2021, Scheer was involved with HBO Max's scripted podcast, Batman: The Audio Adventures.

Scheer also co-founded Wolfpop which later merged with Earwolf.

Comics
In 2014, Scheer ventured into comics with writing partner Nick Giovannetti to create a 5-part Boom mini-series, ALIENS vs. PARKER. In 2015, he appeared in The Astonishing Ant-Man #4 by Nick Spencer and Ramon Rosanas, after co-writing a team-up between Ant-Man and Drax the Destroyer in Guardians Team-Up #7.

Scheer and Giovanetti continued their collaboration with Marvel Comics, where they penned Deadpool Bi-Annual #1, a Guardians Team Up, which were released September 2014 and 2015. More recently, they wrote for Marvel "Spider-Man-Deadpool" (2017) and "Cosmic Ghost Rider Destroys Marvel History" (2019).

Scheer also authored two comics for DC. The Harley Quinn short story "It's a Horrible Life" which he co-wrote with Nick Giovanetti, Steve Lieber, Marissa Louise, and Carlos M. Mangual, and Batman: The Audio Adventures Special, a prequel to the podcast series Scheer voiced. Other writers for the comic include Dennis McNicholas, Bobby Moynihan and Heidi Garnder.

Philanthropy and activism 
In 2008, along with fellow comedians Rob Riggle, Horatio Sanz, and Rob Huebel, Scheer completed four USO comedy shows for American troops in Iraq.

In 2010, Scheer organized a charity event with Ben Stiller called A Night of 140 Tweets, in which he got 140 comedians and actors to appear on stage at the UCB Theater in Los Angeles, each of them reading a single tweet. The performers included Stiller, Will Ferrell, Ashton Kutcher, Demi Moore, Aziz Ansari, the cast of It's Always Sunny in Philadelphia, Dane Cook, Wilmer Valderrama, John Cho, Mindy Kaling, and Sasha Grey. The event, released as a charity DVD and online download, raised over $500,000 for Haiti.

In 2019, Paul was arrested during Jane Fonda’s Fire Drill Friday demonstration on the Capitol steps in Washington DC. Scheer also helped organize The Big 100, a program that asked Americans to take progressive actions in the 100 days following President Donald Trump's inauguration.

Personal life
Scheer lives in Los Angeles and is married to actress-writer June Diane Raphael. They first met in January 2004, after the artistic director of Manhattan's Upright Citizens Brigade Theatre brought Scheer in to offer tips to Raphael and her comedy partner, Casey Wilson, on improving their UCB two-woman sketch show and started dating shortly afterward. They moved from New York to Los Angeles in 2006. In October 2009, Scheer and Raphael married at the Santa Barbara Museum of Natural History. Scheer's best man was a Jack Nicholson impersonator. They have two sons, born in April 2014  and August 2016.

Scheer is a self-described fan of the Los Angeles Clippers. His favorite vacation spot is Disney World. In September 2015, Scheer said he practices Transcendental Meditation.

Filmography

Film

Television

References

External links

 
 
 Unspooled with Paul Scheer and Amy Nicholson on Earwolf
 How Did This Get Made? with Paul Scheer, Jason Mantzoukas and June Diane Raphael on Earwolf
 Human Giant home page
 Paul Scheer talks about the fear behind NTSF:SD:SUV::
 Artwork created by Scheer and presented at the Lost Panel at the San Diego Comic Con 2009

Interviews/Articles
 Podcast interview with Caleb Bacon
 Interview at /Film.com
 Interview at LosAnjealous.com
 Interview at Bloodydisgusting.com
 Interview at WickedInfo.com

1976 births
Living people
20th-century American male actors
21st-century American male actors
American male comedians
American male film actors
American male television actors
American podcasters
American sketch comedians
American television writers
American male television writers
Male actors from New York (state)
Male actors from New York City
New York University alumni
People from Huntington, New York
Showrunners
Comedians from New York City
Upright Citizens Brigade Theater performers
Screenwriters from New York (state)
20th-century American comedians
21st-century American comedians